Inimfon “Ini” Joshua Archibong (born 23 June 1983) is an industrial designer, creative director, artist and musician who is active in product design, furniture design, environmental design, architecture, watch design, and fashion.

Archibong's work reflects an interest in master-craftsmanship and its relationship to modern and ancient technology. It is inspired by the study of architecture, environmental and product design, as well as mathematics, philosophy and world religions. He has said about the relationship between art and design, "The idea that something has to be useless in order to be art is something I reject."

Early life and education 
The son of Nigerian parents who emigrated to the United States as academic scholars, Archibong was born in Pasadena, California. He attended and was graduated from the Polytechnic School, then briefly attended the USC business school before dropping out. He subsequently enrolled at ArtCenter College of Design where he was both an Edwards Entrance Scholar and an Art Center Outreach Grant recipient, was also named the 2010 Student Designer of the Year, and from which he received a degree in Environmental Design.

After graduation, he joined Tim Kobe's  in Singapore, before continuing his studies at the École Cantonale d’Art de Lausanne (ÉCAL), where he earned a master's of advanced studies in Design for Luxury and Craftsmanship.

Career 

Archibong began exhibiting his work at the Milan Furniture Fair in the mid 2010s. His 2016 furniture collection titled "The Secret Garden" was produced with the support of the actor Terry Crews. This was followed by several exhibitions of his furniture designs for Sé Collections at the Rossana Orlandi gallery. He began an ongoing collaboration with the Knoll furniture company in 2018 creating designs such as the "Iquo Cafe Collection". In 2019 Hermès began marketing Archibong's "Galop d’Hermès" wristwatch. In 2020, Archibong started working on the creation of sculptural pieces for a solo exhibition at the Friedman Benda Gallery in New York.

In addition to his artwork and design practice, Archibong has taught at several design institutions and is a visiting professor at his alma mater ÉCAL, and has also taught at the International Institute for Management Development (IMD) in Lausanne and the National University of Singapore in Singapore. He has also lectured and spoken internationally including at the College Art Association conference, USC School of Architecture, and in Dubai and Design Indaba in Cape Town.

In 2019, along with business development collaborations with Benjamin de Haan, Archibong founded L.M.N.O. CREATIVE, a multi-disciplinary design collective. The collective includes fellow graduates from Pasadena's ArtCenter, Jori Brown and Maxwell Engelmann, as well as designer Ebony Lerandy, who studied under Archibong at ÉCAL.

Other clients include companies such as de Sede, Bernhardt Design, Diageo, and Logitech.

Awards and exhibitions 
He is the recipient of the ICFF Studio Award, Best of NeoCon Silver, International Woodworking Fair's Design Emphasis Award, ICFF's American Student Designer of the Year Award, and the 2019 Elle Deco American Design Award. In 2019, he received Distinguished Alumni awards from both ArtCenter and Polytechnic in his hometown of Pasadena.

Archibong's work has been exhibited at the Victoria and Albert Museum (V&A) in London, Alyce de Roulet Williamson Gallery in Pasadena, Galerie Triode in Paris, the Museo Bagatti Valsecchi in Milan, Spazio Rossana Orlandi in Milan, Design Indaba in Cape Town, the Dallas Museum of Art, the High Museum in Atlanta, and the Design Museum in London. 

His design for a Pavilion of the African Diaspora (PoAD) won the Best Design Medal at the London Design Biennale at Somerset House in June 2021. In the same year, the Metropolitain Museum of Art (MET) in New York acquired his "Orion" table, "Atlas" chair and "Vernus 3" chandelier for its Afrofuturist Period Room.

In 2022 the Los Angeles County Museum of Art (LACMA) added his "Switch" table to its permanent collection. The table also featured in his second solo show, titled "Narthex", at the Friendman Benda in Los Angeles. His Iquo Cafe Collection for Knoll received a Good Design award in 2022.

In 2023 Archibong's work was included in the exhibition Mirror Mirror: Reflections on Design at Chatsworth at Chatsworth House.

Writing 
The New York Times published an essay by Archibong titled "Ini Archibong: What We Believe About Storytelling" in 2021. The essay is part of a series called The Big Ideas: What Do We Believe, which also includes essays by Agnes Callard, Garry Kasparov, T.M. Luhrmann, Harry Reid, and Carlo Rovelli, amongst others. This work was later published in a compendium titled Question Everything: A Stone Reader.

Personal life 
Archibong lives and works in Neuchâtel, Switzerland. He has a daughter. He is the younger brother of Olympic athlete Koko Archibong.

See also 
Notable Alumni, Polytechnic School
List of ArtCenter College of Design people
Notable alumni, École cantonale d'art de Lausanne
Notable Designers, Knoll, Inc.

Publications 

 Speechless: different by design. Schleuning, Sarah (2019). Dallas Museum of Art, High Museum of Art. Shapco Printing, Dallas, Texas. . .
 The ECAL manual of style: how to best teach design today?. Jonathan Olivares, Alexis Georgacopoulos (2022). Phaidon Press, London. . .
 Before Yesterday We Could Fly: An Afrofuturist Period Room. Ian Alteveer, Hannah Beachler, Sarah E. Lawrence, (2022). Metropolitan Museum of Art, New York. 
 Question everything: a Stone reader. Peter Catapano, Simon Critchley (2022). Liveright, New York. . .

References

External links 
 
 Ini Archibong - Friedman Benda
 Meet The Artists: Ini Archibong (Metropolitan Museum of Art)
 Pavilion of the African Diaspora | London Design Biennale
 Ini Archibong: Making the Chair BBC World Service radio documentary

Living people
1983 births
Art Center College of Design alumni
Artists from Los Angeles
People from Pasadena, California
American designers
American people of Nigerian descent
Furniture designers
Industrial designers
Designers
Neuchâtel
American furniture designers